Pactactes is a genus of spiders in the family Thomisidae. It was first described in 1895 by Simon. , it contains 3 species, all from Africa.

References

Thomisidae
Araneomorphae genera
Spiders of Africa